The 2003 Women's EuroHockey Nations Championship was the sixth edition of the women's field hockey championship organised by the European Hockey Federation. It was held from 1 until 13 September 2003 in Barcelona, Spain. This was the last EuroHockey Nations Championship with 12 teams. The 4 teams ending 9th, 10th, 11th, and 12th were relegated to the first EuroHockey Nations Trophy. The 8 remaining teams played in the 2005 Women's EuroHockey Nations Championship.

Qualified teams

Format
The twelve teams were split into two groups of six teams. The top two teams advanced to the semi-finals in order to determine the winner in a knockout system. The 3rd and 4th placed teams from each pool played for the 5th to 8th place, while the 5th and 6th placed teams from each pool played for the 9th to 12th place. The last four teams were relegated to the EuroHockey Nations Challenge.

Results
''All times were local (UTC+2).

Preliminary round

Pool A

Pool B

fifth to twelfth place classification
5th place bracket

9th place bracket

5th–8th place semifinals

9th–12th place semifinals

11th place game

9th place game

7th place game

5th place game

First to fourth place classification

Semifinals

Third and fourth place

Final

Final standings

See also
 2003 Men's EuroHockey Nations Championship

References

Women's EuroHockey Nations Championship
EuroHockey Nations Championship
EuroHockey Nations Championship
International women's field hockey competitions hosted by Catalonia
Sports competitions in Barcelona
2000s in Barcelona
EuroHockey Nations Championship
Women 1
EuroHockey Nations Championship
Field hockey at the Summer Olympics – Women's European qualification